Sir Gerald Fitzgerald, 3rd Lord Decies was the son of John Fitzgerald and Ellen, daughter of Maurice FitzGibbon, the White Knight.

The Decies property was originally a part of the Desmond estate until James, the 8th Earl of Desmond, bequeathed to his younger son, Gerald, Decies and Dromana Castle.

John Fitzgerald died at Dromany on December 18, 1524, when his son and heir Gerald Fitzgerald entered into possession of the premises.  Gerald Fitzgerald, 3rd Lord Decies, died at Templemichael, February 25, 1553, and was succeeded by his son and heir, Maurice, first Viscount Decies.

Sir Gerald Fitzgerald married Ellice, daughter of Piers Butler, 8th Earl of Ormond and had issue:
Sir Maurice Fitzgerald
Sir James Fitzgerald
Gerald Fitzgerald
Mary, who married Sir Oliver Grace

See also
Ashfield Gales

Notes

References

Ancestry

Bibliography

1553 deaths
16th-century Irish people
Gerald
Year of birth unknown